Ann(e) Miller or Millar may refer to:

People
Anne Mackenzie-Stuart (née Millar, 1930–2008), Scottish pro-European Union activist
Ann Miller (1923–2004), American dancer, singer and actress
Ann R. Miller (1921–2006), American sociologist and demographer
Anna, Lady Miller (1741–1781), English poet, travel writer, and salonnière
Anne Miller (author), Scottish author, scriptwriter, producer, comedian, and researcher
Anne Marie Miller (born 1980), American author and public speaker
Annie Miller (tennis) (born 1977), American tennis player
Ann Russell Miller (1928–2021), American socialite and Catholic nun

Fictional characters
Anne Miller, character in 1972 play 6 Rms Riv Vu

See also
Anna Miller (disambiguation)